Glenzer Glacier is a glacier  west of Conger Glacier, draining northward from Knox Coast into the eastern part of the Shackleton Ice Shelf, Antarctica. It was mapped by G.D. Blodgett (1955) from air photos taken by U.S. Navy Operation Highjump (1946–47). It was named by the Advisory Committee on Antarctic Names for Lieutenant Hubert Glenzer, Jr., a pilot with U.S. Navy Operation Windmill (1947–48), who assisted in operations resulting in the establishment of astronomical control stations along the coast from Wilhelm II Coast to Budd Coast.

See also
 List of glaciers in the Antarctic
 Glaciology

References

 

Glaciers of Wilkes Land